Skrzyczne is a mountain in southern Poland, in the Silesian Voivodeship, close to the town of Szczyrk. It is the highest mountain of the Silesian Beskids.

Skrzyczne is one of the Polish Crown Peaks.

The outskirts of Szczyrk can be reached by a two-stage chairlift. On the mountain slopes, a lot of bilberries grow, which are picked and sold on roadsides.

References 

Silesian Beskids
Silesian Beskids one-thousanders
Mountains of Poland
Bielsko County